The Peache Trust is an Anglican body formed in 1877. It owns the advowson (the right to appoint the vicar) for a number of Anglican churches in England, and is responsible for selecting and appointing appropriate candidates as vicar for the churches in its trust.  it held the advowson for 45 churches.

References

Church of England societies and organisations
Anglican organizations established in the 19th century
Organizations established in 1877
1877 establishments in England